Miranda Cicognani (born 12 September 1936) is a retired Italian gymnast. At the opening ceremony of the 1952 Summer Olympics she became the first Italian woman to bear the Olympic flag of Italy. She took part in the 1952, 1956 and 1960 Games with the best result of sixth place in the team all-around event in 1952. Her younger sister Rosella competed alongside in 1956 and 1960.

See also
 List of flag bearers for Italy at the Olympics
 List of Olympic female gymnasts for Italy

References

1936 births
People from Forlì
Italian female artistic gymnasts
Gymnasts at the 1952 Summer Olympics
Gymnasts at the 1956 Summer Olympics
Gymnasts at the 1960 Summer Olympics
Olympic gymnasts of Italy
Living people
Sportspeople from the Province of Forlì-Cesena